Šuňava is a village and municipality in Poprad District in the Prešov Region of northern Slovakia.

Geography
The municipality lies at an altitude of 871 metres and covers an area of 26.406 km². It has a population of about 1900 people.

History
In historical records the village was first mentioned in 1269.

Infrastructure and economy
In the village is a gym hall and a central park. Šuňava is known for producing concrete blocks.

Churches in village 

 Roman Catholic Church of All saints
 Roman Catholic Church of st. Nicholas

References

External links
Official homepage

Villages and municipalities in Poprad District